The 1971 Chicago Cubs season was the 100th season of the Chicago Cubs franchise, the 96th in the National League and the 56th at Wrigley Field. The Cubs finished third in the National League East with a record of 83–79.

Offseason 
 November 30, 1970: Hoyt Wilhelm was traded by the Cubs to the Atlanta Braves for Hal Breeden.
 December 3, 1970: Phil Gagliano was traded by the Cubs to the Boston Red Sox for Carmen Fanzone.

Regular season

Season standings

Record vs. opponents

Notable transactions 
 June 8, 1971: 1971 Major League Baseball draft
Dennis Lamp was drafted by the Cubs in the 3rd round. Player signed June 11, 1971.
Jim Tyrone was drafted by the Cubs in the 7th round.
 September 9, 1971: Bruce Sutter was signed as an amateur free agent by the Cubs.

Roster

Player stats

Batting

Starters by position 
Note: Pos = Position; G = Games played; AB = At bats; H = Hits; Avg. = Batting average; HR = Home runs; RBI = Runs batted in

Other batters 
Note: G = Games played; AB = At bats; H = Hits; Avg. = Batting average; HR = Home runs; RBI = Runs batted in

Pitching

Starting pitchers 
Note: G = Games pitched; IP = Innings pitched; W = Wins; L = Losses; ERA = Earned run average; SO = Strikeouts

Other pitchers 
Note: G = Games pitched; IP = Innings pitched; W = Wins; L = Losses; ERA = Earned run average; SO = Strikeouts

Relief pitchers 
Note: G = Games pitched; W = Wins; L = Losses; SV = Saves; ERA = Earned run average; SO = Strikeouts

Farm system

Notes

References 

1971 Chicago Cubs season at Baseball Reference

Chicago Cubs seasons
Chicago Cubs season
Chicago Cubs